The Culture Vultures is a British sitcom that aired on BBC1 in 1970. The series starred Leslie Phillips as a university lecturer and three episodes were co-written by Tim Brooke-Taylor. The entire series was wiped and is no longer thought to exist.

Background
The Culture Vultures was originally going to be piloted in Comedy Playhouse, but it was decided it was good enough to go straight to a series. After the second episode, the lead Leslie Phillips collapsed with an internal haemorrhage. He recovered enough to return to the series. His next sitcom lead would be Casanova '73.

Cast
Leslie Phillips - Dr Michael Cunningham
Jonathan Cecil - Dr Ian Meredith
Peter Sallis - Professor George Hobbes
Sally Faulkner - Vivienne

Plot
Dr Michael Cunningham is a senior lecturer in anthropology at the University of Hampshire. A gambler and womaniser, his quest for an easy life is frequently interrupted by his friends and colleagues. His casual attitude leads to clashes with his seniors. He enjoys the campus nightlife and is always looking for an opportunity to travel.

Episodes
The series aired on Fridays at 7:55pm. In line with the BBC's archival policy of the time, all five episodes were wiped and none are thought to survive.

References
General

Specific

1970 British television series debuts
1970 British television series endings
1970s British sitcoms
BBC television sitcoms
Lost BBC episodes